Milan Jagodić (born 11 March 1991) is a Serbian professional footballer who plays as a defender.

References

External links
 
 
 
 

Association football defenders
Association football midfielders
FK BASK players
FK Budućnost Dobanovci players
FK Jedinstvo Užice players
FK Kolubara players
FK Mladost Lučani players
FK Palić players
FK Rad players
FK Zemun players
Serbian First League players
Serbian footballers
Serbian SuperLiga players
Sportspeople from Užice
1991 births
Living people